Ian Vernon Hogg (1 January 1926 – 7 March 2002) was a British author of books on firearms, artillery, ammunition, and fortification, as well as biographies of several famous general officers. During his career he wrote, co-wrote, edited, or co-edited about 150 books and sold well over 1 million copies.

Biographical sketch

Born on 1 January 1926, Ian V. Hogg enlisted in the Royal Artillery of the British Army in April 1945. During World War II he served in Europe and in eastern Asia. After the war he remained in the military. In the early 1950s, he served in the Korean War. Altogether he served in the military for 27 years. Upon retiring in 1972, he held the appointment of Master Gunner at the Royal Military College of Science, where he taught on the subjects of firearms, artillery, and their ammunition and use.  Hogg also had an interest in the subject of fortification and was one of the founding members of the Fortress Study Group in 1975.

His first books were published in the late 1960s while he was still an instructor. After retiring from the military, he pursued the career of military author and historian. He was editor of Jane's Infantry Weapons from 1972 to 1994. He worked with a skilled artist, John Batchelor, to ensure that his books were well illustrated with cutaway diagrams. He contributed articles to a variety of journals, and his books have been translated into a dozen languages. In Brazil, Argentina, and Spain his translated books are popular among military circles.

Hogg has been described by publishing people who worked with him as "an unassuming man, with a gift to pass on [his] knowledge at any level, and often with a dry humour", which is a gift that most of his readers can readily discern. He was also respected for his professionalism as an author. Walter said that he was "a consummate professional who (unlike most of his peers) usually submitted manuscripts on time, within agreed parameters, and accompanied by all the illustrations."

Hogg was a frequent guest on the History Channel's Tales of the Gun and a contributor to the A&E channel's 1996 series The Story of the Gun, as well as other military-related television programs. He was described as being "one of the most objective researchers on firearms and their origins".

Death

He died on 7 March 2002 aged 76.

Bibliography

References

Notes

Sources
  (Greenhill Books Company newsletter.)
  (Greenhill Books Company newsletter.)

1926 births
2002 deaths
British Army personnel of the Korean War
British Army personnel of World War II
British male writers
British military historians
British non-fiction writers
Royal Artillery officers
20th-century non-fiction writers
Male non-fiction writers
Historians of weapons